Victoria Shaw (25 May 1935 – 17 August 1988) was an Australian film and television actress.

Early years
Shaw was born Jeanette Ann Lavina Mary Elizabeth Elphick in Sydney, New South Wales, Australia. Her parents were Captain and Mrs. Francis W. Elphick. She lived in Croydon, New South Wales, and attended a convent school.

Career 
Shaw worked in an insurance office for six months before she went to the Dally-Watkins Agency, where she studied modelling with June Dally-Watkins before making her Australian screen debut opposite Chips Rafferty in The Phantom Stockman (1953). Bob Hope spotted her while touring Australia and urged her to try her luck in Hollywood, where in 1955 she signed a contract with Columbia Pictures.

She played opposite Tyrone Power in The Eddy Duchin Story (1956), her United States film debut. Her subsequent films included The Crimson Kimono and Edge of Eternity (both 1959), Because They're Young and I Aim at the Stars (both 1960), Alvarez Kelly (1966), and Westworld (1973). She also made appearances in TV shows, including 77 Sunset Strip (1962), The Man from U.N.C.L.E. (1964), 12 O-Clock High (two episodes: 1964 and 1966), Cimarron Strip (1968), The F.B.I. (two episodes: both 1968), Ironside (1969), Barnaby Jones (1973), General Hospital (1974), McCloud (1976), and Charlie's Angels (1978).

Personal life
Shaw married actor Roger Smith in North Hollywood, California, on July 28, 1956. After their divorce in 1965, Smith had joint custody of their three children, Tracey Leone (born 1957), Jordan F. (born 1958), and Dallas E. (born 1961). She married producer Elliott Alexander in 1966. They also divorced.

Death
On August 17, 1988, Shaw died in Hornsby Hospital in Sydney at the age of 53 from emphysema.

Recognition 
Shaw was named Australia's Model of the Year in 1951. The next year, she was named Photographer's Model of the Year.

Filmography

References

External links

 

1935 births
1988 deaths
Australian film actresses
Australian television actresses
Actresses from Sydney
Australian emigrants to the United States
20th-century Australian actresses
Deaths from emphysema
New Star of the Year (Actress) Golden Globe winners